Atlantic Express is a high speed catamaran operated by Argentinian ferry operator Colonia Express.  She was launched on 28 January 1991 as Hoverspeed Boulogne. The vessel operates between Buenos Aires and Colonia del Sacramento.

References

Incat high-speed craft
1991 ships
Ships built by Incat